Wrestling was one of the sports which was held at the 1990 Asian Games in Shijingshan Gymnasium, Beijing, China between 23 September and 3 October 1990. The competition included only men's events.

Medalists

Freestyle

Greco-Roman

Medal table

References
 FILA Database

 
1990 Asian Games events
1990
Asian Games
1990 Asian Games